The Directorate General of Marine and Fisheries Resources Surveillance  is a government agency under the management of the Ministry of Marine Affairs and Fisheries of Indonesia. Formally established on 23 November 2000 according to Presidential Decree No. 165/2000, the PSDKP is the agency responsible for supervising the marine and fishery resources of the Republic of Indonesia. The main mission of PSDKP is the prevention of Illegal, unreported and unregulated fishing in Indonesian waters, which has caused a substantial loss for Indonesia's fishing industry. In its mission to prevent illegal fishing, PSDKP has conducted joint-operations with the Indonesian Navy, Water Police, Sea and Coast Guard, the Maritime Security Agency and Customs. PSDKP is however is not associated with these agencies.

Background 
Illegal, unreported and unregulated fishing activities in Indonesian waters have caused huge losses for Indonesia. Overfishing, overcapacity, threats to the preservation of fish resources, unfavorable fishery business climate, the weakening of the competitiveness of firms and the marginalization of fishermen are the real impact of illegal fishing and destructive fishing activities. Another disadvantage that can not be assessed materially but is strongly related to the national pride, is the negative image of the Indonesian nation among the international community because it is considered not able to manage marine and fishery resources properly.

Task and function 
Based on Presidential Regulation No. 63/ 2015 on the Ministry of Marine Affairs and Fisheries and Regulation of the Minister of Marine Affairs and Fisheries No. 48/PERMEN-KP/2020 on the Organization and Working Procedures of the Ministry of Marine Affairs and Fisheries, PSDKP's primary task formulation and execution of marin and fisheries management. Its function are as follows:
 Develop policies in the field of marine and fisheries management, including but no limited to fishery control, operation of supervisory vessels, and handling of marine and fishery criminal acts.
 Execution of policies in the field of marine and fisheries management.
 Develop norms, standards, procedures and criteria in the field of marine and fisheries management.
 Provide technical guidance and supervision in the field of marine and fisheries management.
 Evaluate and report activity in the field of marine and fisheries management
 Perform administrative duty of the Directorate General of Marine and Fisheries Resources Surveillance
 Perform other task as instructed by Minister of Marine Affairs and Fisheries.

The legal basis for PSDKP in carrying out its task are as follows:
 Law No. 17/ 1985 on the Ratification of the United Nations Convention on the Law of the Sea
 Law No. 27/ 2007 amended by Law No. 1/ 2014 on the Management of Coastal Areas and Small Islands
 Law No. 21/ 2009 concerning the Endorsement of the Agreement for the Execution of the United Nations Convention on the Law of the Sea of 10 December 1982 Relating to the Conservation and Management of Straddling Fish Stocks and Highly Migratory Stocks;
 Law No. 32/ 2014 concerning Marine Affairs;
 Law No. 45/ 2009 on Amendment to Law Number 31 Year 2004 regarding Fisheries;
 Government Regulation Number 38 Year 2007 on the Division of Government Affairs between the Central Government and Regional Government (Province level, and Regency and City Level)
 Presidential Instruction No. 15 of 2011 on the Protection of Fishermen, which mandates the Ministry of Marine Affairs and Fisheries to take firm action against illegal, unreported, unregulated fishing and destructive fishing in Fishery Management Area of the Republic of Indonesia.

In addition, supervision of marine and fishery resources is also mandated by the following international conventions:
 United Nations Convention on the Law of the Sea (UNCLOS) 1982;
 Agreement to Promote Compliance with International Conservation and Management Measure By Fishing Vessel on The High Seas (FAO Compliance Agreement, 1993);
 Agreement to Execution of The United Nations Convention on The Law of The Sea of 10 December 1982 Relating To The Conservation and Management of Straddling Fish Stock and Highly Migratory Fish Stocks (Fish Stock Agreement) 1995;
 Code of Conduct for Responsible Fisheries (CCRF), 1995;
 International Plan of Action (IPOA) to Prevent, Deter and Eliminate Illegal, Unreported and Unregulated (IUU) Fishing, 2001;
 Regional Plan of Action (RPOA) to Promote Responsible Fishing Practices Including Combating IUU Fishing in the Region.

Organisation 
PSDKP is an Echelon I Unit under the Ministry of Marine Affairs and Fisheries. PSDKP is also coordinate with other unit within Ministry of Marine Affairs and Fisheries in performing its duties.

 Directorate General of Marine and Fisheries Resources Surveillance
 Secretariat of Directorate General
 Directorate of Fleet Monitoring and Operation
 Directorate of Marine Resources Management Supervision
 Directorate of Fisheries Management Supervision
 Directorate of Marine Offence Management

Technical Execution Unit 
The Technical Execution Unit (UPT) of PSDKP was established based on the Decree of the Minister of Marine Affairs and Fisheries No.33/PERMEN-K /2016 on the Organization and Working Procedures of the Technical Execution Unit in the Field of Marine and Fishery Resources Control. In accordance with the Ministerial Regulation, UPT PSDKP is tasked for execution of supervision of marine and fishery resources based on the prevailing laws and regulations.

The UPT PSDKP is categorized into 2 (two), which are Marine and Fishery Resource Base (Echelon II Equivalent Working Unit) and Marine and Fishery Resource Control Station (Echelon IVA equivalent Working Unit). 14 UPTs have been formed:

 PSDKP Batam Station
 PSDKP Benoa Station
 PSDKP Bitung Station
 PSDKP Jakarta Station
 PSDKP Lampulo Station
 PSDKP Tual Station
 PSDKP Ambon Station
 PSDKP Belawan Station
 PSDKP Biak  Station
 PSDKP Cilacap Station
 PSDKP Kupang Station
 PSDKP Station Pontianak
 PSDKP Tahuna  Station
 PSDKP Tarakan Station

UPT PSDKP is also supported by the Working Unit (Satuan Kerja/ Satker) PSDKP and PSDKP office spread throughout the territory of Indonesia. To date, 58 Working units and 142 PSDKP offices have been formed.

Equipment

Manpower 
The total number of civil servants in the environment of PSDKP until 2012 is 904 persons, consisting of structural officials, functional Officials, supervisor and operator.

Vessel Monitoring System (VMS) 
VMS is the application of information technology which is one form of surveillance system in the field of fishing and / or transporting of fish, which uses the fishing equipment monitoring equipment that has been determined. VMs Executions are implemented through the installation of transmitters on fishing vessels so that their movements can be monitored when performing fishing operations (ship position, velocity of vessel, track lane, and the occurrence of fishing activities indicated to be infringing). Policies related to VMs continue to be updated in line with the strategic development of the fisheries sector and the development of monitoring technology.

To further optimize the function of VMS, PSDKP is designing an integrated system (Integrated Surveillance System / ISS) which is done by overlaying VMS data with data obtained through other monitoring means such as coastal radar (Coastal Radar) and Marine Surveillance Aircraft MSA).

Vessels 
Surveillance vessels and speed boat function are to carry out supervision and law enforcement in the field of fisheries. As of August 2016, PSDKP has 124 surveillance vessels and speed boat, which consist of: 
 4 units of type 60 m surveillance vessel
 2 units of type 42 m surveillance vessel
 1 units of type 39.5 m surveillance vessel
 6 units of type 36 m surveillance vessel
 5 units of type 32 m surveillance vessel
 10 units of type 28 m surveillance vessel
 2 units of type 23 m surveillance vessel
 2 units of type 18 m surveillance vessel
 2 units of type 17 m surveillance vessel
 1 units of type 15.5 m surveillance vessel.
 89 units of speed boat

Cooperation with other agencies 
 Indonesia-Australia Fisheries Surveillance Forum (IAFSF)
The Indonesia-Australia Fisheries Surveillance Forum (IAFSF) is part of the Indonesia-Australia Ministerial Forum (IAMF) dedicated to cooperation in the supervision of the SDKP, including the cooperation of illegal fishing in the border waters of both countries. In May 2021 a joint maritime patrol called Operation Gannet 5 is conducted within the framework of IAFSF.
 Regional Plan of Action (RPOA) to Promote Responsible Fishing Practices including combating illegal, unreported and unregulated (IUU) fishing in the Southeast Asia Region.
It is a regional initiative initiated by Indonesia-Australia and agreed by 11 countries: Indonesia, Malaysia, Thailand, Philippines, Vietnam, Cambodia, Singapore, Brunei Darussalam, Timor Leste, Australia and Papua New Guinea. The goal is to realize responsible fishing activities including the IUU Fishing in the area of cooperation. This cooperation has been inaugurated by Indonesia and Australia since 2007, Indonesia has become the RPOA Secretariat.

References

External links 
 PSDKP Official Website

Indonesia